Roses for Mama may refer to:

 Roses for Mama (album), a 1977 album by C.W. McCall
 "Roses for Mama" (song), the title track and Top 5 country hit by McCall
 Roses for Mama, a 1990 novel by Janette Oke